Where Mankind Fails is the debut studio album by Swedish power metal band Steel Attack. It was released on June 21, 1999.

Track listing

Credits
John Allan - Guitar
Andreas de Vera - Drums
Steve Steel - Vocals, Bass
Dennis Vestman - Guitars
Daniel Nummelin - Keyboards (guest)
Peter Kronberg - Choir Vocals
Adrian Maleska - Cover

1999 debut albums
Steel Attack albums
AFM Records albums